In Summer We Must Love (Egyptian Arabic: في الصيف لازم نحب translit: Fi Saif Lazem Nihib or Fil Seef Lazem Neheb) is 1974 Egyptian comedy featuring Salah Zulfikar in the leading role as Dr. Nabil, the psychiatrist and directed by Mohamed Abdel Aziz. The film features an ensemble cast that includes Nour El-Sherif, Abdel Moneim Madbouly, Samir Ghanem, Lebleba, Magda El-Khatib and Emad Hamdy.

Plot 
Dr. Nabil, a psychiatrist and his orderly take four male patients to a beach resort in Alexandria to help them integrate into the society and overcome their mental illnesses. The four patients meet their new soul mates. Three of the girls are with their very old fashioned and strict father, but finally love combines between every young man and woman, and they agree to get married. This summer trip and love helped Dr. Nabil to treat his patients and cure them from their illness.

Main cast 

 Salah Zulfikar: Dr. Nabil
 Nour El-Sherif: Ahmed
 Samir Ghanem: Geneidy
 Abdel Moneim Madbouly: Abdel Hafeez
 Lebleba: Rawya
 Magda El-Khatib: Nadia
 Madiha Kamel: Madiha
 Osama Abbas: Hassan
 Emad Hamdy: Hospital director
 Samir Sabri: Medhat
 Saeed Saleh: Osama
 Mohamed Lotfy: Mohammed

References

External links 

 

1974 films
1970s Arabic-language films
20th-century Egyptian films
Egyptian romantic comedy films
Films shot in Egypt
1974 romantic comedy films